The men's 100 metres event at the 1988 World Junior Championships in Athletics was held in Sudbury, Ontario, Canada, at Laurentian University Stadium on 27 and 28 July.

Medalists

Results

Final
28 July
Wind: -2.8 m/s

Semifinals
28 July

Semifinal 1

Wind: -1.5 m/s

Semifinal 2

Wind: +0.8 m/s

Quarterfinals
28 July

Quarterfinal 1

Wind: -2.9 m/s

Quarterfinal 2

Wind: -2.2 m/s

Quarterfinal 3

Wind: -2.3 m/s

Quarterfinal 4

Wind: -1.8 m/s

Heats
27 July

Heat 1

Wind: +1.5 m/s

Heat 2

Wind: -1.0 m/s

Heat 3

Wind: +0.9 m/s

Heat 4

Wind: +1.4 m/s

Heat 5

Wind: +1.0 m/s

Heat 6

Wind: +0.6 m/s

Heat 7

Wind: +1.2 m/s

Heat 8

Wind: +0.6 m/s

Participation
According to an unofficial count, 54 athletes from 41 countries participated in the event.

References

100 metres
100 metres at the World Athletics U20 Championships